The Violin Concerto in D major, Op. 61, was written by Ludwig van Beethoven in 1806. Its first performance by Franz Clement was unsuccessful and for some decades the work languished in obscurity, until revived in 1844 by the then 12-year-old violinist Joseph Joachim with the orchestra of the London Philharmonic Society conducted by Felix Mendelssohn. Joachim would later claim it to be the "greatest" German violin concerto. Since then it has become one of the best-known and regularly performed violin concertos.

Genesis
Beethoven had previously written a number of pieces for violin and orchestra. At some point in 1790–2, before his musical maturity, he began a Violin Concerto in C, of which only a fragment of the first movement survives. Whether the work, or even the first movement, had ever been completed is not known. In any event, it was neither performed nor published. Later in the 1790s, Beethoven had completed two Romances for violin – first the Romance in F and later the Romance in G.

These works show a strong influence from the French school of violin playing, exemplified by violinists such as Giovanni Battista Viotti, Pierre Rode and Rodolphe Kreutzer. The two Romances, for instance, are in a similar style to slow movements of concerti by Viotti. This influence can also be seen in the D major Concerto; the 'martial' opening with the beat of the timpani follows the style of French music at the time, while the prevalence of figures in broken sixths and broken octaves closely resembles elements of compositions by Kreutzer and Viotti.

Performance history
Beethoven wrote the concerto for his colleague Franz Clement, a leading violinist of the day, who had earlier given him helpful advice on his opera Fidelio. The work was premiered on 23 December 1806 in the Theater an der Wien in Vienna, the occasion being a benefit concert for Clement. The first printed edition (1808) was dedicated to Stephan von Breuning.

It is believed that Beethoven finished the solo part so late that Clement had to sight-read part of his performance. Perhaps to express his annoyance, or to show what he could do when he had time to prepare, Clement is said to have interrupted the concerto between the first and second movements with a solo composition of his own, played on one string of the violin held upside down; however, other sources claim that he did play such a piece but only at the end of the performance.

The premiere was not a success, and the concerto was little performed in the following decades.

The work was revived in 1844, well after Beethoven's death, with a performance by the then 12-year-old violinist Joseph Joachim with the orchestra of the London Philharmonic Society conducted by Felix Mendelssohn. Ever since, it has been one of the most important works of the violin concerto repertoire, and is frequently performed and recorded today.

Performance practice

It has been said that not only in this piece, but generally, "Recordings demonstrate that ... it was the practice in the early twentieth century to vary the tempo considerably within a movement," and that in the concerto, there is "often one big trough (slowing?) in the central G major passage."

Structure
The work is in three movements:

It is scored, in addition to the solo violin, for flute, two oboes, two clarinets in A, two bassoons, two Natural horns, two Natural trumpets, timpani, and strings.

1. Allegro ma non troppo 
The movement starts with four beats on the timpani and leads into a theme played by the oboes, clarinets and bassoons. The strings enter with a non-diatonic D# that leads into a V7 chord. The clarinets and bassoons play another theme. This is suddenly interrupted by a louder section in B-flat major. This leads into a theme in D major and later in the parallel minor. The soloist enters with a V7 chord in octaves. This movement is about 21 minutes long.

2. Larghetto 
This movement is in G major. It is about 10 minutes long.

3. Rondo. Allegro 
This movement starts without pause from the second movement. It begins with the famous "hunting horn" theme. There is a section in G minor. After the cadenza, it ends with a typical V-I cadence. This movement is about 10 minutes long.

Cadenzas
Cadenzas for the work have been written by several notable violinists, including Joachim. The cadenzas by Fritz Kreisler are probably most often employed. More recently, composer Alfred Schnittke provided controversial cadenzas with a characteristically 20th-century style; violinist Gidon Kremer has recorded the concerto with the Schnittke cadenzas. New klezmer-inspired cadenzas written by Montreal-based klezmer clarinetist and composer Airat Ichmouratov for Alexandre Da Costa in 2011 have been recorded by the Taipei Symphony Orchestra for Warner Classics.

The following violinists and composers have written cadenzas:

 Leopold Auer
 Joshua Bell
 Ferruccio Busoni
 Stephanie Chase
 Ferdinand David
 Jakob Dont
 Isaak Dunayevsky
 Mischa Elman
 Carl Flesch
 Joseph Hellmesberger Sr.
 Jenő Hubay
 Joseph Joachim
 Patricia Kopatchinskaja
 Fritz Kreisler
 Christiaan Kriens
 Airat Ichmouratov
 Ferdinand Laub
 Hubert Léonard
 Nathan Milstein
 Bernhard Molique
 Miron Polyakin
 Manuel Quiroga
 Camille Saint-Saëns
 Wolfgang Schneiderhan
 Alfred Schnittke
 Sayaka Shoji
 Ödön Singer
 Louis Spohr
 Maxim Vengerov
 Henri Vieuxtemps
 Henryk Wieniawski
 August Wilhelmj
 Eugène Ysaÿe

Alternative versions
Perhaps due to the Violin Concerto's lack of success at its premiere, and at the request of Muzio Clementi, Beethoven revised it in a version for piano and orchestra, which was later published as Op. 61a. For this version, which is present as a sketch in the Violin Concerto's autograph alongside revisions to the solo part, Beethoven wrote a lengthy first movement cadenza which features the orchestra's timpanist along with the solo pianist.  More recently, it has been arranged as a concerto for clarinet and orchestra by Mikhail Pletnev. Robert Bockmühl (1820/21–1881) arranged the solo violin part for cello & played it as a Cello Concerto; Gary Karr played Bockmühl's arrangement on a double-bass tuned in fifths as a double bass concerto.

Recordings
The first known recording of Beethoven's violin concerto was made in 1925 for Polydor by violinist Josef Wolfsthal, with Hans Thierfelder conducting the Berlin Staatsoper Orchestra. Hundreds of recordings have been made since, among which the following have received awards and outstanding reviews:

1947: Yehudi Menuhin/Lucerne Festival Orchestra/Wilhelm Furtwängler
1953: Wolfgang Schneiderhan, Berlin Philharmonic, Eugen Jochum, Deutsche Grammophon – "Rosette" by the Penguin Guide
1954: David Oistrakh with Sixten Ehrling cond. the Stockholm Festival Orchestra in Stockholm over 10–11 June 1954. Testament CD: "David Oistrakh Beethoven & Sibelius", 1994.
1955: Jascha Heifetz, Boston Symphony Orchestra, Charles Munch, RCA Victor – "Mid-price choice" by BBC Radio 3 Building a Library, September 2003
1957: Ida Haendel, Czech Philharmonic, Karel Ančerl, Suraphon – 14 May 2010.
1959: Isaac Stern, New York Philharmonic, Leonard Bernstein, Sony "Unique cadenza in last movement"
1974: Arthur Grumiaux, Concertgebouw Orchestra, Colin Davis, Philips – "4 star" by the Penguin Guide
1980: Anne-Sophie Mutter, Berlin Philharmoniker, Herbert von Karajan, Deutsche Grammophon
1980: Itzhak Perlman, Philharmonia Orchestra, Carlo Maria Giulini, EMI – Gramophone Award, 1981
1997: Thomas Zehetmair, Orchestra of the Eighteenth Century, Frans Brüggen, Philips – "First choice" by BBC Radio 3 Building a Library, September 2003
1999: Hilary Hahn, Baltimore Symphony Orchestra, David Zinman, Sony Classical
2006: Isabelle Faust, Prague Philharmonia, Jiří Bělohlávek, Harmonia Mundi – "First choice" by BBC Radio 3 Building a Library, April 2011; Diapason d'Or by Diapason, April 2011
2009: Patricia Kopatchinskaja, Orchestre des Champs-Elysées, Philippe Herreweghe, Naïve - BBC Music Magazine Award 2010 (orchestral category)
2011: Isabelle Faust, Orchestra Mozart, Claudio Abbado, Harmonia Mundi – "Disc of the Month" by Gramophone, March 2012; "Disc of the Month" by BBC Music Magazine, April 2012; "Diapason d'Or Arte" by Diapason d'Or and Arte; Gramophone Award, 2012; Preis der deutschen Schallplattenkritik; Echo Klassik 2012
2020: Daniel Lozakovich, Münchner Philharmoniker, Valery Gergiev, Deutsche Grammophon - Cadenza Kleisler, 2020
2022: Vilde Frang, Pekka Kuusisto, Deutsche Kammerphilharmonie Bremen - Parlophone Records, 2022

References

Footnotes

Bibliography

Beethoven, Ludwig van: Konzert für Violine & Orchester D-dur Opus 61. (Facsimile edition of autograph full score) Österreichische Nationalbibliothek, Wien, Mus. Hs. 17.538. Edited, with commentary (in German) by Franz Grasberger. Graz, 1979.

 (ten essays by various authors)

External links

Complete performances from the Internet Archive

Violin concertos by Ludwig van Beethoven
1806 compositions
Compositions in D major
Music dedicated to ensembles or performers